Edvardas Adamkavičius (March 31, 1888 – May 10, 1957) was a Lithuanian general.

Early life 
He was born in Pikeliai, Telšiai County, Lithuania.

Interwar Lithuanian Army 
He enlisted in the Lithuanian Army in 1918. He was made a lieutenant general on September 6, 1933, a brigadier general in 1936 and a divisional general on February 16, 1937. He retired in 1940.

Occupation and emigration 
After the occupation of Lithuania by the Soviet Union, he fled to Germany. He emigrated to the United States in 1949. He died in Worcester, Massachusetts.

Family 
He was the uncle of future President of Lithuania, Valdas Adamkus.

Bibliography
Visuotinė lietuvių enciklopedija, Bd. 1, S. 73.

References

1888 births
1957 deaths
American people of Lithuanian descent
Lithuanian emigrants to the United States
Lithuanian generals
People from Mažeikiai